Black River Falls Area Airport  is a public use airport located three nautical miles (6 km) south of the central business district of Black River Falls, a city in Jackson County, Wisconsin, United States. It is owned by the city of Black River Falls and Jackson County.

It is included in the Federal Aviation Administration (FAA) National Plan of Integrated Airport Systems for 2021–2025, in which it is categorized as a local general aviation facility.

Although most U.S. airports use the same three-letter location identifier for the FAA and IATA, this airport is assigned BCK by the FAA but has no designation from the IATA (which assigned BCK to Bolwarra, Queensland, Australia).

Facilities and aircraft 
It has one asphalt paved runway designated 8/26 which measures 4,601 by 75 feet (1,402 x 23 m). 

For the 12-month period ending June 22, 2022, the airport had 1,500 aircraft operations, an average of 29 per week: 87% general aviation, 7% military and 7% air taxi. In January 2023, there were 19 aircraft based at this airport: 17 single-engine and 2 multi-engine.

A non-directional beacon, 362 kHz, ident: BCK is on field.

See also
List of airports in Wisconsin

References

External links 
 Black River Falls Area Airport at Wisconsin DOT Airport Directory
 

Airports in Wisconsin
Buildings and structures in Jackson County, Wisconsin